Hardeek Joshi (born October 6, 1988) is a Marathi television and film actor in Mumbai. He known for his portrayed in Zee Marathi's Tujhyat Jeev Rangala as Rana. Currently he doing a role of Siddharth in Tuzya Mazya Sansarala Ani Kay Hava.

Career
Hardik Joshi featured in the 2016 Makarand Anaspure film, Rangaa Patangaa. As of 2016, he has played Rana da, the central character, in Zee Marathi's show, Tujhyat Jeev Rangala. His character falls in love with Anjali, played by Akshaya Deodhar. In 2017, he appeared in a villainous role in the film, Journey Premachi.

An ardent devotee of Shri Swami Samarth Maharaj, Hardeek Joshi has been seen in Zee Marathi's shows, like Asmita and Radha Hi Bawari. He played Purshottam Gokhale in Star Pravah's show, Durva and has also appeared in Swapnachya Palikadale and Crime Patrol.

Personal life 
He got engaged with his fellow actress Akshaya Deodhar from Tujhyat Jeev Rangala in 2022.

Media image

Films

Television

References

External links 
 
 Hardeek Joshi at Twitter
 Hardeek Joshi at Facebook
 Hardeek Joshi at Instagram

Marathi actors
Living people
1988 births
Male actors in Marathi television